Lawrenceburg High School is a high school located in Lawrenceburg, Indiana.
The current building was built in 1937.  In 1964 the new gym(later named the Bud Bateman gym) was built to bring the sectionals back to Lawrenceburg.  The School was renovated in 1980–1981.  This brought the addition of the auxiliary gym, swimming pool, auditorium, and new choir room, band room, and cafeteria. by 2011 the foundation in the Bateman gym was shifting and it was demolished in 2014 and replaced with the current gymnasium in the same location.  The new gym opened in 2015.

See also
 List of high schools in Indiana
 Eastern Indiana Athletic Conference

References

External links
Official Website

Public high schools in Indiana
Buildings and structures in Dearborn County, Indiana
1937 establishments in Indiana